Shravan Gupta (born 1973) is an Indian businessman, serving as the chairman of MGF Group. He was previously a director at Emaar MGF Land.

Early and personal life 
Gupta has done his bachelor's degree in commerce from Shri Ram College of Commerce, University of Delhi. He is married to Shilpa Gupta and has two daughters with her.

Career 
After doing his B.Com from a college in Delhi, Shravan joined his family business, namely Motor & General Finance Ltd. (MGF), a vehicle-finance/lending company which had been founded in 1930. He served as a Non-executive director of Motor & General Finance until 30 March 2007. In 1997, MGF diversified into real estate, when Shravan founded MGF Developments. The company created over 5 million square feet of mainly retail space (but also some commercial and residential space), building five shopping malls, including three in Gurgaon which are clustered together within a range of one Km (The Metropolitan, The Metropolis and The Megacity Mall), and one each in Delhi (City Square Mall) and Jaipur (MGF Metropolitan Mall).

Joint Venture with Emaar
In 2006, Shravan's MGF Developments entered into a joint venture with Emaar Properties PJSC Dubai to invest in the Indian realty space. The joint venture company, Emaar MGF, has invested about Rs.8,500 crore in the Indian real estate market, of which about Rs. 7000 crore (INR 70 billion/USD 1 billion) was brought in by Emaar, which represents the largest Foreign direct investment in India in the real estate sector.
Emaar and MGF announced that they were parting ways and that the joint venture would be divided vertically. Two months later, Shravan resigned from his position as Executive Vice-Chairman & Managing Director of Emaar MGF.

Other Sources
The NCLT later allowed the withdrawal of insolvency proceedings against Shravan Gupta’s real estate firm, after the company reached to a settlement with the homebuyers who had dragged the company to NCLT.

References 

1973 births
Living people
Indian businesspeople
Indian real estate businesspeople
Businesspeople from Delhi
People from New Delhi
Shri Ram College of Commerce alumni